Beh or BEH may refer to:

 Beh (letter), the second letter of many Semitic abjads
 Beh (surname), a Chinese, German, and Liberian surname
 Southwest Michigan Regional Airport (IATA: BEH), in Benton Harbor, Michigan
 Bulgarian Energy Holding, a Bulgarian state-owned energy company
 Beryllium monohydride, a molecule with the formula BeH